Said Ahmed El-Ashry (born 15 August 1949) is an Egyptian boxer. He competed at the 1972 Summer Olympics and the 1976 Summer Olympics.

References

External links
 

1949 births
Living people
Egyptian male boxers
Olympic boxers of Egypt
Boxers at the 1972 Summer Olympics
Boxers at the 1976 Summer Olympics
Mediterranean Games silver medalists for Egypt
Mediterranean Games medalists in boxing
Competitors at the 1971 Mediterranean Games
Flyweight boxers
20th-century Egyptian people